Gloria Dorothy Hooper, Baroness Hooper,  (born 25 May 1939) is a British lawyer and a Conservative life peer in the House of Lords.

The daughter of Frederick and Frances (née Maloney) Hooper, she was educated at La Sainte Union Convent High School, Southampton, and at the Royal Ballet School. She attended the University of Southampton, where she received a Bachelor of Arts in law in 1960 and at Universidad Central del Ecuador, where she was a Rotary Foundation Fellow. Baroness Hooper opened The British School of Quito in September 1995.

Legal background
Hooper was assistant to the chief registrar of John Lewis Partnership between 1960–961 and editor in current law of Sweet & Maxwell, Law Publishers between 1961–62. From 1962–67, she was information officer, to the Winchester City Council and from 1967–72, assistant solicitor with Taylor and Humbert. In 1972–73, Hooper was legal adviser to Slater Walker France S.A. Between 1974–84, she was partner with Taylor and Humbert (now Taylor, Wessing).

Political career
An active member of the Conservative Party, Hooper was the party's candidate for Liverpool in the 1979 European Parliament election. Although the seat was thought to be safe Labour, Hooper won it by 7,227 over Labour's Terry Harrison, a member of the Militant group. Comparing the election with the total votes cast in the 1979 general election five weeks previously, the swing to the Conservatives was 11% in Liverpool, as against 5% nationally.
Hooper was defeated in the 1984 election in the Merseyside West constituency.

Affiliations
 Anguilla All Party Parliamentary Group, co-chair
Law Society of England and Wales, member
 Member of the Advisory Board, Polar Research and Policy Initiative
 President of the British Educational Suppliers Association
 Vice-President of Canning House (Hispanic and Luso Brazilian Council)
 President of Waste Watch
 President of the European Foundation For Heritage Skills
 Institute for the Study of the Americas (University of London), councilmember
 President of Good Guy's Cancer Appeal
 President of the Anglo Latin-American Foundation
 President of the Friends of Colombia for Social Aid
 President of the Central America Business Council (CABC)

Trusteeships and Fellowships
 Trustee, Royal Academy of Dance
 Trustee, Centre for Global Energy Studies
 Trustee, National Museums and Galleries of Merseyside Development Trust
 Trustee/Fellow, Industry and Parliament Trust (and fellow)
 Trustee, The Tablet
 Fellow, Royal Society of Arts
 Fellow, Royal Geographical Society.

Peerage
She was invested as a Companion of the Order of St Michael and St George (CMG) in the 2002 New Year's Honours and on 10 June 1985, she was created a life peer with the title Baroness Hooper, of Liverpool and St James's in the City of Westminster. She was created a Dame of the Order of St Gregory the Great.

References

Sources

1939 births
Living people
People educated at the Royal Ballet School
Alumni of the University of Southampton
Companions of the Order of St Michael and St George
Conservative Party (UK) MEPs
Conservative Party (UK) life peers
Dames of St. Gregory the Great
English Roman Catholics
Fellows of the Royal Geographical Society
Life peeresses created by Elizabeth II
People associated with the University of London
20th-century Roman Catholics
21st-century Roman Catholics
MEPs for England 1979–1984
20th-century women MEPs for England